Papuk is the largest mountain in the Slavonia region in eastern Croatia, near the city of Požega. It extends between Bilogora to the northwest, Krndija to the east, and Ravna gora and Psunj to the southwest.

The highest peak is the eponymous peak at 953 m.a.A.

The area of Papuk is designated a nature park (park prirode), a kind of protected area in Croatia.

At the seventh European Geopark Network Open Conference, hosted by North West Highlands Geopark in September 2007, the Papuk Geopark became the first Croatian Geopark and 30th member of the European and UNESCO Global Geoparks Network.

Geopark Papuk was awarded licence second time from UNESCO in 2011.

Name
There are several supposed etymologies of the name "Papuk", it's almost certainly not of Croatian origin. One is that it comes by assimilation from earlier "Bapuk", where "Ba" is the name of the Celtic tribe that inhabited the region, and "Puk" comes from the Indo-European root *peiH, meaning "big". However, from the historical sources, it's visible that Papuk was originally a hydronym. Based on that, it's been suggested that the name comes from the repetitive of the Indo-European root *bhogj (to flow), *bhebhogj, so that it means "that which flows and flows". However, there are several problems with that etymology. First, it's visible by hydronyms such as "Bosut" and "Bosna" that Indo-European *bh gave *b in the local language. Second, *bhebhogj would actually mean "flow and flow" and not "that which flows and flows", so the endings don't match. So, it's been suggested that the name is of Pre-Indo-European origin.

Papuk Geopark
The Papuk Geopark is a geopark in Croatia which is situated in two counties, Požega-Slavonia and Virovitica-Podravina, and includes upland forests of the Papuk and Krndija mountains, and edges of agricultural fields. In September 2007, the Papuk Geopark became the first Croatian geopark (an area with an expressed geological heritage and a strategy for a sustainable economical development) and the 30th member of the European Geoparks Network and a member of the UNESCO-assisted Global Geoparks Network.

The Papuk mountains belong to the Slavonia highlands which are in Pannonia, a low-lying area of Slavonia. Even though, the Slavonia highlands are not higher than 1,000 meters, their presence is very noticeable in the landscape. This is because the surrounding alluvial fields are at around 100 m height above sea level, while the hillsides are only 100 m above the fields. The highlands are mostly covered with forests, which differentiates them from the surrounding landscape.

Within the Slavonia highlands, the Papuk Mountain stretches from west to east and is the most spacious and most interesting mountain. From the main mountain-ridge well intended are two spurs and a tract watered by a drainage basin in the direction north south. As a remarkable point, emphasis lies on peaks Točak (887 m), Papuk (953 m), Ivačka glava (913 m), Češljakovački vis (820 m), and Kapovac (792 m), which are spread out continuously, and act as a drainage divide between the numerous tributary streams flowing to the river Drava to the north, and the river Sava to the south.

Ravna Gora

Ravna Gora is a mountain in the Slavonia region in eastern Croatia. It is located between Psunj and Papuk, northeast of Pakrac and southeast of Daruvar.
It is bound from the north by the Pakra river, and from the east by river Orljava.

Geographers usually classify Ravna Gora as mountain ridge of the Papuk mountain range. In its western part Papuk mountain range is about 20 km wide, formed by three parallel ridges: Lisina (Crni vrh 863 m), Ljutoč (716 m) and Ravna Gora.

See also
 List of National Geoparks
 Sustainable tourism

References

External links
 Papuk Geopark
 Nature Park Papuk
 Papuk Geopark at the European Geoparks Network
 Papuk Geopark at unesco.org
 Global Network of National Geoparks

Mountains of Croatia
Mountain ranges of Croatia
Nature parks of Croatia
Slavonia
Ridges of Europe
Pannonian island mountains
Landforms of Požega-Slavonia County
Tourist attractions in Požega-Slavonia County